Barycentric can refer to:

In astronomy,
Barycenter or barycentre, the center of mass of two or more bodies that orbit each other
Barycentric coordinates, coordinates defined by the common center of mass of two or more bodies (see Barycenter)
Barycentric Coordinate Time, a coordinate time standard in the Solar system 
Barycentric Dynamical Time, a former time standard in the Solar System

In geometry,
Barycentric subdivision, a way of dividing a simplicial complex
Barycentric coordinates (mathematics), coordinates defined by the vertices of a simplex